Brigadier General Bernard Nkawa was a Namibian military officer whose last appointment was as Defence Attaché to DRC.

Career

PLAN career
Nkawa's military career began in Peoples Liberation Army of Namibia, the military wing of SWAPO in 1975 and received military training at Oshatotwa in the Western Province of Zambia. He was then deployed to PLAN's Eastern Front covering Zambia and the Zambezi region. From 1977 to 1979 he attended a Battalion Commander course in the USSR. Upon completion of his studies he returned to Zambia and then transferred to Angola, as 2nd Brigade training commander at Tobias Hainyeko Training Center from 1980 to 1982. Then afterwards he was appointed chief instructor for Namibian instructors delegated to train  special units of FAPLA in guerrilla tactics from 1982 to 1983. He was then appointed Chief of Staff Rhino Battalion at the north western front in Techipa in 1985. Between 1988 and 1989 he attended the Infantry Brigade commander course in Yugoslavia. He was then repatriated back to Namibia under the UNTAG process.

NDF career 
Nkawa was inducted into the Namibian Defence Force as a pioneer with the rank of Major at Namibian Independence. He was then appointed 261 Battalion second in command(2IC) between 1990 and 1994. He was then transferred to 124 Battalion as a second in command between 1994 and 1998. Between 1996 and 1997 he was deployed to UNAVEM III in Angola as  deputy contingent commander. He was then promoted to Lieutenant Colonel and appointed Commanding Officer from 1998 to 2001, during this period he was deployed to the DRC under Operation Antlantic in the Second Congo War between 1998 and 1999 as a battle group commander in the eastern front.  He participated in anti UNITA operations in the Kavango region and southern Angola known as Operation Mandume from 2000 to 2002 as the Battalion commander. He was then appointed 26 Motorised Infantry Brigade Commander from 2001 to 2008. Between 2008 and 2010 he was the Commandant of the Oshivelo Army Battle School. 12 Motorised Infantry Brigade was his next command between 2010 and 2014 as General officer Commanding. He was then appointed to the DRC as a Defence Attache between 2014 and 2018. He retired in 2018 and died in a motor vehicle accident in the Zambezi Region in November 2020.

Qualifications
 Senior Staff Course and masters in Military science, 1993-94-India
 Advance Military law 1996
 Defence Management-2000
 Executive Course in Defence Management  2001
 International Senior officers Peace Support Operations Planner 2004
 Executive course in Security Section governance, 2005
 2007 National Defence College- Kenya

Honours and decorations
Grand Commander of the Most distinguished order of Namibia 2nd class
  Namibian Army Pioneer Medal
  Army Ten Years Medal
  NDF Ten Years Medal
  Army Twenty Years Service Medal
  UNAVEM Medal
  NDF Campaign Medal
  Mandume Ya Ndemufayo Operation Medal

References

1958 births
Namibian military personnel
2020 deaths
People's Liberation Army of Namibia personnel